The 8th Lumières Awards ceremony, presented by the Académie des Lumières, was held on 14 February 2003. The ceremony was hosted by Frédéric Mitterrand and presided by Carole Laure. Amen. won the award for Best Film.

Winners

See also
 28th César Awards

References

External links
 
 
 8th Lumières Awards at AlloCiné

Lumières Awards
Lumières
Lumières
Lumières Awards
Lumières Awards